Maura Lianne Gillison is an American medical oncologist and molecular epidemiologist. She is credited as the first investigator to establish a connection between HPV and oral cancer.

Early life and education
Gillison was born in Canada but moved regularly through Canada, the United States, and Mexico, due to her father's position. She completed her Bachelor of Science degree in zoology from Duke University before moving to Maryland for her medical degree and PhD at Johns Hopkins University (JHU).

As a graduate student, Gillison co-published a study in 2000 through the Journal of the National Cancer Institute which demonstrated a link between human papillomavirus virus (HPV)-16 and oropharyngeal cancers. She is credited as the first investigator to establish a connection between HPV and oral cancer. She later stated that although the paper impacted her entire career, she was "having so much fun that I didn’t realize its implications." Following her time at JHU, Gillison was inducted as a member of Delta Omega, an honorary society for studies in public health.

Career
Following her 2000 study, Gillison became the senior investigator on a 2007 New England Journal of Medicine study Case–Control Study of Human Papillomavirus and Oropharyngeal Cancer showing that HPV 16 infection results in head and neck squamous cell carcinoma (HNSCCs) in both men and women, and that having multiple oral sex partners increases the risk for developing these cancers. The following year, Gillison and her research team described distinct risk factor profiles for HPV16–positive and HPV16–negative HNSCCs.

Gillison was recruited from JHU in 2009 to join the Ohio State University Comprehensive Cancer Center with research grants from the National Cancer Institute (NCI). In the same year, she presented data at the American Society of Clinical Oncology (ASCO) conference showing that HPV is the most important predictor of clinical response to tumor therapy and prognosis for patients with these cancers. As a result of her work, the NCI recommended that clinical trials in HNSCC stratify tumors by HPV status. The following year, she was inducted into the American Society for Clinical Investigation. She was also honored by the American Association for Cancer Research with the 2012 Richard and Hinda Rosenthal Memorial Award.

As the Jeg Coughlin Chair in Cancer Research, professor in the division of medical oncology, and member of the cancer control program at the Ohio State University Comprehensive Cancer Center, Gillison was elected a member of the National Academy of Medicine. She was also inducted into JHU's Society of Scholars in 2016.

In 2017, Gillison joined the MD Anderson Cancer Center to continue her research into HPV-caused cancers. She also began investigating the genetics underlying how HPV causes human cells to become cancerous. During the COVID-19 pandemic, Gillison was appointed to Sensei Biotherapeutics, Inc's Immuno-Oncology Advisory Board. She was also the recipient of the 2021 David A. Karnofsky Memorial Award and Lecture from the ASCO.

References

Living people
American oncologists
Duke University alumni
Johns Hopkins Bloomberg School of Public Health alumni
Johns Hopkins University faculty
University of Texas MD Anderson Cancer Center faculty
Members of the National Academy of Medicine
Members of the American Society for Clinical Investigation
Year of birth missing (living people)